In 1985, the Ontario Progressive Conservative Party held two leadership elections: one in January, and one in November.

January Convention

Background
The January convention was held at the CNE Coliseum at Exhibition Place in Toronto to choose a replacement for William Davis, who had served as Ontario PC leader and Premier of Ontario since 1971. Davis had been expected to call an election to seek a further mandate from the voters, but surprised pundits by retiring from political life instead.

Four of Davis's cabinet ministers announced their intentions to seek the leadership: Frank Miller, Dennis Timbrell, Larry Grossman, and Roy McMurtry. Grossman and McMurtry were considered to be Red Tories who would continue in the tradition of moderate government maintained by Davis and his predecessor as leader and premier, John Robarts. Miller was supported by the right wing of the party, who believed that he would take a more aggressive approach to reducing the size of the provincial government. Timbrell was viewed as being a centrist.

In initial candidate debates, few differences in policy emerged. Instead the differences manifested in political outlook. Miller, supported by 27 members of caucus, was viewed as the candidate of small town conservatism. Grossman, with 10 supporting members was the candidate of high-powered urbanity. Timbrell with 18 supporting members was seen more along the lines of the previous leader, aping Davis's pragmatic blandness. McMurtry coming in last with 8 supporting members tried to portray a populist image with links to ethnic communities.

Procedure
The voters at the convention consisted of delegates elected from PC riding associations, delegates elected from other PC associations such as those for women, campuses, youth and business groups, as well as ex-officio delegates such as party members who held elected office, and members of the party's executive bodies.

Convention
During the convention an 'Anybody But Miller' pact was a significant influence. Miller's convention speech was solid, yet unspectacular. If anything it reassured delegates who were concerned over policy gaffes made by Miller before the convention. Miller emerged with a significant lead on the first ballot which he kept through to the final ballot. As each candidate with the fewest votes was dropped after each ballot, he threw his support behind Grossman, which seemed to confirm the 'Anybody But Miller' pact theory. Grossman edged out Timbrell for second place on the second ballot and, facing elimination, demanded a recount which produced the same result. After the second ballot when Timbrell threw his support to Grossman, his  supporters were more divided and enough of them voted for Miller to enable him to win the convention.

Ballot results

November Convention

Following the party's poor showing in the 1985 election, the party retained power with only a slim plurality of four seats and lost their government majority status. The opposition Liberals gained the support of the third party, the New Democratic Party. The Liberals and the NDP negotiated an accord whereby the NDP agreed to support the Liberals in a new government provided that they support NDP policy initiatives. On June 26, 1985, the Liberals passed a motion of no confidence and the PCs fell from power for the first time in 44 years. Miller resigned as leader, and a new convention was called, to be held again in Toronto.

Timbrell and Grossman announced their intentions to run, along with Alan Pope, who had been Minister of Natural Resources in the Davis government. This time, Grossman had a clear lead going into the convention. Pope was dropped after the first ballot, and Grossman a narrow victory on the second ballot.

Ballot results

(Held at the Metro Toronto Convention Centre, Toronto on November 16, 1985.)

First ballot:

GROSSMAN, Larry 752
TIMBRELL, Dennis 661
POPE, Alan 271

Second ballot:

GROSSMAN, Larry 848
TIMBRELL, Dennis 829

References

1985 elections in Canada
1985
1985 political party leadership elections
January 1985 events in Canada
November 1985 events in Canada